Warren Redlich (born March 8, 1966) was born in Syosset, New York and as of 2022 is a YouTuber covering technology, especially related to Tesla_Inc, SpaceX and related topics. He is a retired lawyer and former politician. He earned Bachelor of Arts degrees in Economics and Mathematical Economic Analysis from Rice University in 1988, a Master of Arts degree in political science from Stanford University in 1992, and his Doctor of Jurisprudence from Albany Law School in 1994.  He was the Libertarian Party candidate in the New York gubernatorial election, 2010.

Political activity
During his gubernatorial campaign, Redlich coordinated some of his events with Green Party candidate Howie Hawkins. He has served on the Guilderland town board since 2007 as a Republican.

Redlich ran as the Republicans' nominee against Congressman Michael McNulty for the seat representing New York's 21st congressional district in 2004 and 2006. He lost the 2004 race by a 71–29% vote, and lost in 2006 by a 78–22% margin.

Redlich was a candidate in 2010 for New York Governor for the nominations of both the Republican Party and Libertarian Party. Redlich defeated Sam Sloan for the Libertarian nomination, 27–17, at the party convention. Redlich also attended the New York Republican Convention but received no votes there, and subsequently failed to muster any support for a petition drive. In the general election, Redlich finished in fourth place with 48,359 votes (1%).

Redlich has been accused of cybersquatting. He purchases domain names related to his political opponents and others and posts websites about them such as the now-defunct christineodonnell08.com site, primarily as a means of revenue. He has heavily advertised on the Internet during his gubernatorial campaign.

In October 2010, Redlich claimed Roger Stone, the campaign manager for Kristin M. Davis, encouraged an outside group to circulate flyers labeling Redlich a "sexual predator" and a "sick twisted pervert,"  citing a Redlich blog post regarding controversy at the time surrounding Miley Cyrus, as a source, and encouraging people to "call the police" if they encountered him.  Redlich later sued Stone for defamation over the flyer's allegations and sought damages of $20,000,000. However, the jury returned a verdict in favor of Stone in December 2017. While the jury found the flyers defamatory, they found that Redlich failed to prove Stone was involved in producing or distributing them.

Political positions
Redlich's most prominent political position is expressed in his motto, "stop wasting money." He proposes placing a salary cap on all state workers limiting them to a salary of $100,000 or less, with those making over $100,000 having their salary cut at the first opportunity, while still protecting existing union contracts. He supports same-sex marriage, prosecution of corrupt public officials, ending corporate welfare, the elimination of some state agencies, and referendum approval of pay increases for legislators. He opposes a constitutional convention, calling it a distraction. He proposes limiting local governments to five sources of revenue. He supports the construction of the proposed Muslim community center two blocks from the World Trade Center site. He supports reforming driving under the influence laws and supports ending the War on Drugs.

References

New York (state) Republicans
People from Guilderland, New York
Living people
1966 births
New York (state) Libertarians
Rice University alumni
Stanford University alumni
Albany Law School alumni
New York (state) Democrats
Florida Republicans